Results from the 1966 Buenos Aires Grand Prix held at Buenos Aires on January 23, 1966, in the Autódromo Oscar Alfredo Gálvez. The race was the first race for the XV Temporada Argentina.

Classification

Second race
Results from the 1966 Buenos Aires Grand Prix held at Buenos Aires on January 23, 1966, in the Autódromo Oscar Alfredo Gálvez.The race was the first race for the XV Temporada Argentina.

Buenos Aires Grand Prix
1966 in motorsport
1966 in Argentine motorsport
January 1966 sports events in South America